(also spelled  ,  or ) comes from Italian for "story-singer" and is known by many other names around the world. It is a theatrical form where a performer tells or sings a story while gesturing to a series of images. These images can be painted, printed or drawn on any sort of material.

Asia
In 6th-century India, religious tales called s were performed by traveling storytellers who carried banners painted with images of gods from house to house. Another form called  featured the storytellers carrying vertical cloth scrolls and sung stories of the afterlife. In recent times, this is still performed by Chitrakar women from West Bengal, India.

In Indonesia, the scroll was made horizontally which is called the wayang beber and employed four performers: a man who sings the story, two men who operate the rolling of the scroll, and a woman who holds a lamp to illuminate particular pictures featured in the story. Other Indonesian theater forms, which are labelled as shadow play are the wayang kulit and wayang golek which uses rod puppetry, these are still performed today.

In the 20th century, Japanese candymen on bicycles would bring serial shows called  where the story was told on a series of changing pictures that slid in and out of an open-framed box. Some  shows had a raree show element to them, where a viewer could pay extra to peer through a hole and see a supposed artifact from the story.

Europe

In Spain up to the 19th century there were blind men who would be accompanied by a young helper who would make a living by going from town to town where they would display illustrations, and the blind man would recite or sing a story, often about crimes, while his helper pointed at the illustration relevant at that point. These were called "" (blind man stories).

The singing bench migrated northward to Central and Northern Europe where it served as sensationalist quasi-news about murder, fires, death, affairs, sex and scandals. Performers of such controversial bench songs were seen as vagrants and troublemakers and were often arrested, exiled, or ostracised for their activities.

The German  survives in Bertolt Brecht's The Threepenny Opera and in the performance work of Peter Schumann.

In Czechoslovakia banner shows were called . Most of them have disappeared, with the notable exception of a parody song Cannoneer . In Hungary the term is called .

Elsewhere

In aboriginal Australia storytellers paint story sequences on tree bark and also on themselves for the purposes of performing the tale.

In the 19th century, giant scrolling moving panorama shows were performed throughout the United Kingdom and United States. The 20th century has seen cantastoria employed by the radical art, theater and puppetry movements to tell stories from perspectives outside of the mainstream media, especially by the Bread and Puppet Theater. Elements of picture storytelling can also be seen in the portable mural-posters of the Beehive Collective.

See also 
 Storytelling
 Murder ballad
 Oral storytelling
 Oral tradition

References

Sources 
 Mair, Victor H., Painting and Performance: Chinese Picture Recitation and its Indian Genesis. Honolulu: University of Hawaii Press, 1988.
 Too Many Captain Cooks, film by Penny McDonald starring Paddy Wainburranga
 Mariangela Giusti and Urmila Chakraborty (editors), 2014, 

Visual arts genres
Theatrical genres
Puppetry in Italy
Storytelling
Performing arts in India
Italian words and phrases
Song forms